Robert Rooney (8 July 1938 – 9 August 2016) was a Scottish footballer, who made 47 appearances in the Football League playing for Sheffield United, Doncaster Rovers and Lincoln City. He played as a winger.

Rooney was born in Cowie, Stirling, and began his football career with Clydebank Juniors in his native Scotland before joining English Second Division club Sheffield United in 1958. He played occasionally in his first two seasons with the club, but not thereafter. In the 1962–63 season, he was registered with three clubs: Sheffield United transferred him to Doncaster Rovers for a £5,000 fee in October 1962, but exchanged him for Lincoln City's Albert Broadbent soon afterwards. Rooney made his Lincoln debut in January 1963, yet at the end of the season, Lincoln confirmed that he was one of four players available for transfer. He made his last Lincoln appearance in December 1963 before moving into English non-league football with Gainsborough Trinity.

References

1938 births
2016 deaths
Footballers from Stirling
Scottish footballers
Association football wingers
Clydebank Juniors F.C. players
Sheffield United F.C. players
Doncaster Rovers F.C. players
Lincoln City F.C. players
Gainsborough Trinity F.C. players
English Football League players